Khanom chak is a local dessert of Thailand. The main ingredients are sticky rice flour, palm sugar and shredded coconut. It is covered by leaves of a nipa palm and then roasted on a charcoal fire.

History 
Khanom chak can be found in many areas in Thailand close to the coastal area because all of the ingredients are found in these areas. The name of comes from the nipa palm which in Thailand is called chak. Nipa palm leaves are used to cover because they make a frangent. It is folk wisdom over many centuries.

Khanom chak is used in the sacred ceremony at Phra Samut Chedi, a pagoda in Amphoe Phra Samut Chedi, Samut Prakan.

Ingredients 
 Sticky rice flour			
 Palm sugar				
 Shredded coconut 			
 Water
 Nipa palm leaves
 Little stick

See also 
 Thai cuisine
 List of Thai desserts

References 

Thai desserts and snacks